In enzymology, a dolichyldiphosphatase is an enzyme that catalyzes the chemical reaction

dolichyl diphosphate + H2O  dolichyl phosphate + phosphate

Thus, the two substrates of this enzyme are dolichyl diphosphate and H2O, whereas its two products are dolichyl phosphate and phosphate.

This enzyme belongs to the family of hydrolases, specifically those acting on acid anhydrides in phosphorus-containing anhydrides.  The systematic name of this enzyme class is dolichyl-diphosphate phosphohydrolase. Other names in common use include dolichol diphosphatase, dolichyl pyrophosphatase, dolichyl pyrophosphate phosphatase, dolichyl diphosphate phosphohydrolase, and Dol-P-P phosphohydrolase.  This enzyme participates in n-glycan biosynthesis.

References

 

EC 3.6.1
Enzymes of unknown structure